Tejendra Khanna (born 16 December 1938) is the former Lieutenant Governor of Delhi twice, from January 1997 to April 1998 and again from April 2007 - July 2013. He also served as Chancellor of Delhi Technological University, Indraprastha Institute of Information Technology, Delhi, Guru Gobind Singh Indraprastha University and Ambedkar University.

Early life and education
Tejendra Khanna was born in Patna, Bihar on 16 December 1938. He earned his Master of Science (Physics) from Patna University and Master of Arts in Public Administration from University of California, Berkeley.

Career
He was a 1961 batch Indian Administrative Service (IAS) officer. He held different administrative positions in Punjab. He was the Chief Secretary, Punjab during 1991-92 and conducted the 1992 February elections in Punjab as Chief Election Officer, which brought back an elected Government in the state after a long period of President’s Rule.

He also held important positions in the Government of India. He served as Commercial Counselor, Indian High Commission, U.K. (1975–77), Chief Controller, Imports and Exports (1989–91), Secretary to Government of India, Ministry of Food (1992–93) and Commerce Secretary to Government of India (1993–96).

Immediately on his retirement on 31.12.1996, he was appointed 16th Lt. Governor and Administrator of the National Capital and served in this capacity up to April 1998. He again served as Delhi's 19th Lt. Governor from 9 April 2007 to 8 July 2013.

Honours, awards and international recognition
He was conferred an Honorary Doctorate Degree in Political Science, by the Wonkwang University on 2010 and a Doctorate Degree (Honoris Causa) by TERI University.

See also
 Najeeb Jung
 List of lieutenant governors of Delhi

References

External links
 Profile on Delhi Govt website
 news article
 Address of the Shri Tejendra Khanna at Annual Convocation of Jamia Millia Islamia University

1938 births
Living people
Delhi politicians
Indian civil servants
Lieutenant Governors of Delhi
University of California, Berkeley alumni
Politicians from Patna
St. Xavier's Patna alumni
Indian National Congress politicians from Bihar
20th-century Indian politicians